Valentina Sulpizio (born 18 August 1984) is an Italian former professional tennis player.

Her highest WTA singles ranking is 345, which she reached on 24 October 2005. Her career-high ranking in doubles is 199, which she set on 31 October 2005.

ITF Circuit finals

Singles: 12 (8 titles, 4 runner-ups)

Doubles: 70 (41 titles, 29 runner-ups)

External links
 
 

1984 births
Living people
Italian female tennis players
Place of birth missing (living people)
21st-century Italian women